Victory Church is a multi-cultural non-denominational Christian megachurch located in Norcross, Georgia.

History
Founded in 1990, Pastors Dennis and Colleen Rouse held the first service in their small apartment home with just six people. Victory's campus in Norcross welcomes more than 20,000 people from over 140 nations each weekend. Listed 57th in 2010 by Outreach Magazine's 100 Largest Churches in America, the ministry has expanded to include church plants such as Victory North Cobb in Kennesaw, Georgia; Classic City Community Church in Athens, Georgia; and additional campuses, Victory Hamilton Mill in Buford, Georgia and Victory Midtown in Midtown, Atlanta. The name of the church was shortened to "Victory Church" in early 2020. Johnson and Summer Bowie took over as the senior pastors August 16, 2020.

References

External links
 
 Victory Hamilton Mill
 Victory Midtown

Evangelical megachurches in the United States
Megachurches in Georgia
Christian organizations established in 1990
21st-century churches in the United States
Churches in Georgia (U.S. state)